Michael Drake may refer to:
Michael Julian Drake (1946–2011), American astronomer
Michael V. Drake (born 1950), American physician and university president
Mike Drake, American football player and coach
Ol Drake (Oliver Michael Drake, born 1984), British guitarist
Michael Drake, British actor in 1939 melodrama The Return of Carol Deane
Michael Drake, character in 1978 American horror film Dracula's Dog
Michael Drake, American baseball player, see List of 2006 Seattle Mariners draft picks
Michael Drake, unsuccessful candidate in 2010 Weymouth and Portland Borough Council election in Great Britain
Michael Drake, candidate in 2015 Prince Edward Island general election in Canada